Kathrine Larsen (born 5 May 1993) is a Danish footballer who plays as a goalkeeper for Brøndby IF and the Denmark national team.

Career
Larsen made her debut for Denmark in an Algarve Cup fixture against Sweden. She made a close-range save from a Lina Hurtig shot in a 2–1 victory for the Danes.

Club 
During her teenage years, she played, among other things, for Ballerup-Skovlunde Fodbold. In 2015, she switched to Brøndby IF. In 2019 she played for FC Nordsjælland and in 2020 she played for Djurgårdens IF in Damallsvenskan. In 2021, she switched to the Norwegian club Klepp IL, who play in the Toppserien.

National team 
Kathrine Larsen made her debut for Denmark's national team on 7 March 2020 at the Algarve Cup in a match against Sweden, which Denmark won 2-1. She was in the starting lineup. She played her second international match on 21 October 2020, when Denmark won 4-0 over Israel at home. She was also in that match from the start.

External links 

 Kathrine Larsen player profile at UEFA 
 Kathrine Larsen player profile in DBU's national team database 
 Kathrine Larsen profile on WorldFootball.net 
 Kathrine Larsen player profile on Soccerdonna.de 
 Kathrine Larsen player profile on Soccerway

References

1993 births
Living people
Danish women's footballers
Women's association football goalkeepers
Brøndby IF (women) players
FC Nordsjælland (women) players
Djurgårdens IF Fotboll (women) players
Denmark women's international footballers
Danish expatriate women's footballers
Danish expatriate sportspeople in Sweden
Expatriate women's footballers in Sweden